Al-Mubarak is an Arabic family name/Patronymic, means son of Mubarak/descent of Mubarak, and may refer to:

surname
Khaldoon Al Mubarak, Manchester City chairman
Patronymic
 Jaber Al-Mubarak Al-Hamad Al-Sabah (born 1948), government minister of Kuwait, son of Mubarak bin Hamad Al-Sabah
 Salim Al-Mubarak Al-Sabah (1864-1921), ninth sheikh of Kuwait of the line of Al-Sabah, son of Mubarak Al-Sabah
Note: the usual romanization of above name was Jaber bin Mubarak bin Hamad Al-Sabah and Salim bin Mubarak Al-Sabah

See also
 Hosni Mubarak
 Ibn Mubarak
 Ibn al-Mubarak

Arabic-language surnames